The Canal de Lens is a canal in northern France.  It connects Lens to the Canal de la Deûle west of Oignies.  It is 8 km long with no locks.

See also
List of canals in France

References

Lens